John Spence was a professional footballer who played as a wing half for Sunderland.

References

Scottish footballers
Association football wing halves
Kilmarnock F.C. players
Sunderland A.F.C. players
Newcastle East End F.C. players
English Football League players